Rusimbi is an administrative ward in Kigoma-Ujiji District of Kigoma Region in Tanzania. 
In 2016 the Tanzania National Bureau of Statistics report there were 7,462 people in the ward, from 6,779 in 2012.

Villages / neighborhoods 
The ward has 5 neighborhoods.
 Burega
 Kawawa
 Lake Tanganyika
 Sokoine
 Taifa

References

Wards of Kigoma Region